Gecko is an unincorporated community in St. Martin Parish, Louisiana, United States.

Notes

Unincorporated communities in St. Martin Parish, Louisiana
Unincorporated communities in Louisiana